Maria Isabel Preñanosa Bacardit (born 1960 in Barcelona) is a Spanish painter.

Biography
Isabel Bacardit was born in Barcelona, Spain, in 1960. She starts her artistic education at the School of Arts of Poblenou, with Miquel Simó as her teacher, then moves on to the Escola d’Arts Aplicades i Oficis Artistics (Llotja) in Barcelona.

Starting as an abstract painter, she paints on materials she finds in the street: cardboard, wood, etc. Inspired by urban images, she paints using pigments mixed with sawdust and paper-paste to achieve densities and textures. Her compositions are based on primary colours.

In 1984 she is selected for the Fifth Biennale of Barcelona- Young Contemporary Painting. In 1985 she takes part in the First Exhibition of Young Art in Madrid and in the First Biennale of Young Cultural Productions of the European Mediterranean. In 1986 she is again selected for the Second Exhibition of Young Art in Madrid.

With the unexpected death of her partner, the painter Xavier Vidal i Banchs in 1984, Bacardit changes the theme of her work, taking inspiration now from the accidental changes of life. She creates a series of works based on The Disasters of War by Goya and paints proceeding from photographs of accidents taken from newspapers. She also changes her palette, turning to dark and earthen colours.

In 1986, due to the works in preparation for the 1992 Olympics, her paintings reflect the transformation of Barcelona, taking machines and diggers as her main motives.

In 1987 she illustrates the poem Helicón by Bruno Montané Krebs. She travels to Berlin, where she resides for a year. Here her themes are the signs of war, still visible on the buildings in the divided city. She exhibits in the gallery Vendemmia with the title "This is my Silence".

In 1988 she moves to Mallorca, where she comes in contact with the theatre works of the Polish author Tadeusz Kantor. She creates the portfolio "The right to live in peace", with paintings inspired by the theatre of this author.

In 1989 she takes up residence in Santa Coloma de Farnés (Spain). In the midst of nature she changes her themes dramatically. Her work finds inspiration in the landscape, light and silence. She leaves her work on the theme of death, with its dense materiality, behind, moving towards watercolours and transparencies.

In 1990 she lives in Rio de Janeiro, where she works with organisations for the welfare of street children, gives painting classes and establishes her studio in the gallery Maria Teresa Vieira. In Salvador de Bahia she exhibits a series of erotic drawings at the University of Fine Arts.

In 1991 she arrives in Chile. She exhibits in the gallery Buchi in Santiago de Chile and lives in Valparaiso. She collaborates with various artists: Edgard del Canto (painter), Alma Martinoia (painter), Ivo Vergara (painter), Cristina Correa (painter), Teresa Olivera (actress), Hernan Varela (stained glass artist) and Víctor Barrientos Ormazábal (actor and theatre director). With them, she founds the theatre company "Theatre only for Fools".

She begins her series "Earth, Air, Water and Fire". On request of the cultural centre Las Condes of Santiago de Chile she builds a large scale sculpture out of papier-mache  and acrylics: "Bird Woman" which is dedicated to the flamenco dancer Carmen Amaya. For the theatre company "Theatre of Silence" she creates the life size puppets of the play "Taca taca mon amour" by Mauricio Celedón.

In 1994 she returns to Barcelona. She abandons abstract painting and returns to the figurative. In this period stand out:

 The installation "Since ever, until when, since ever" for the "Meeting of Street Artists" in Granada.
 An Exhibition in the civic centre Can Felipa with the collective "Art by Women", with works based on the theme of the female reproductive organs and birth.
 The installation "Shoe-house Zapata"
 Poeto-musical actions with Lucho Hermosilla, Steven Forster and Gaspar Lucas with the poem Altazor by Vicente Huidobro.

In 1996 she travels to Mexico. She meets Ofelia Medina and makes contact with the Zapatista communities in Chiapas, where she becomes strongly influenced by elements of indigenous symbolism and spirituality.

In 1997 she returns to Barcelona. In collaboration with Primitiva Reverter, Judit Bacardit, Montserrat Baqués, Mercè Candó, Caty Fernández and Aina Reverter she initiates the publication of the magazine Adiosas. With the same artists she exhibits in the gallery Espai22a.

In 1998 she works with the Dutch travelling theatre company "Azart Ship of Fools". She travels and acts on the boat of the company and creates masks and part of the costumes for the work The Pilgrim at the End of the World.

In 1999 she establishes herself in Vilarnadal (Girona, Spain), where she lives for six years in an old mill. She paints and cultivates the earth.

In 2002 she exhibits, together with her sister, the sculptor Judit Bacardit, in the information centre of the Parc dels Aiguamolls de l’Empordà and in the exhibition rooms of the Caixa Girona in Roses.

In 2003 they exhibit again at this location. She participates in the European meeting of woman artists "In Via" in Switzerland.

In 2004 she creates the stage design and decorations for the programme "The Ship of Fools" for the local television in Amsterdam.

Since 2005 she lives in Barcelona.

Notes

References

External links 
 Official website of Isabel Bacardit
 XV Concurso de Arte Joven, University of Valparaíso

1960 births
Living people
Painters from Catalonia
20th-century Spanish painters
21st-century Spanish painters
Painters from Barcelona
20th-century Spanish women artists
21st-century Spanish women artists
Spanish women painters